Fanny Midgley (born Fanny B. Frier; November 26, 1879 – January 4, 1932) was an American film actress of Hollywood's early years, mostly in silent films.

Biography
Midgley was born Fanny B. Frier in Cincinnati, Ohio. Beginning at age 15, she acted on stage for 20 years before making the transition to films in 1914. Her work on stage included portraying Mopsa in the Broadway production The Free Lance (1906).

Midgley's first feature film was Shorty Escapes Marriage (1914). In 1914 alone, she had 27 film appearances, including The Sheriff of Bisbee, in which she starred with actress Mildred Harris, the future mother of Charlie Chaplin's first child. From 1915 through 1919, she appeared in another 32 films, mostly in supporting roles. Her last film appearance during this period was the 1919 film The Lottery Man, in which she starred with Wanda Hawley and Wallace Reid.

During the 1920s, her career began to slow, appearing in 22 films between 1920 and 1926, with her biggest film role during that time being in the 1922 film The Young Rajah with Rudolph Valentino. From 1927 to 1929, her career almost completely halted compared to her previous years, with only five film appearances during this period, most notably with Buddy Roosevelt in The Cowboy Cavalier in 1928.

She did transition somewhat successfully to sound films, and appeared in the 1930 movie The Poor Millionaire, starring Richard Talmadge and Constance Howard. In 1931, she appeared in An American Tragedy, starring Sylvia Sidney and Phillips Holmes.

Midgley died at the age of 52 on January 4, 1932, in Hollywood.

Partial filmography
 The Immortal Alamo (1911)
 The Italian (1915)
 Somewhere in France (1916)
 The Apostle of Vengeance (1916)
 Blood Will Tell (1917)
 Madam Who? (1918)
 Wolves of the Rail (1918)
 How Could You, Jean? (1918)
 Cheating the Public (1918)
 The Goat (1918)
 The Corsican Brothers (1920)
 Always Audacious (1920)
 All Soul's Eve (1921)
 Patsy (1921)
 Don't Call Me Little Girl (1921)
 First Love (1921)
 The Young Rajah (1922)
When Love Comes (1922)
 Stephen Steps Out (1923)
 Greed (1924)
 Some Pun'kins (1925)
 Three of a Kind (1925)
 The Dangerous Dub (1926)
 The Fighting Cheat (1926)
 Ace of Action (1926)
 Hair-Trigger Baxter (1926)
 The Harvester (1927)
 The Flyin' Buckaroo (1928)
 The Cowboy Cavalier (1928)
 The Poor Millionaire (1930)
 An American Tragedy (1931)

References

External links

American stage actresses
American film actresses
American silent film actresses
Actresses from Cincinnati
1879 births
1932 deaths
20th-century American actresses